Batman: Year 100 is a four-issue American comic book mini-series starring Batman, published in 2006 by DC Comics. It was written and illustrated by Paul Pope and colored by José Villarrubia.

Publication
The four issue series ran from February to May 2006.

Plot
In the year 2039, Gotham City is very nearly a police state, its citizens subject to unwarranted search and seizure. The Gotham Police clash almost daily with Federal agents, who are pursuing the legendary "Batman". Captain Gordon, the grandson of the original Commissioner Gordon, is also trying to find Batman, and find out what he knows about the murder of a Federal agent.

Collected editions
In 2007, the four issues were collected and published as a trade paperback edition. The trade paperback also includes Pope's "The Berlin Batman", which was originally published in The Batman Chronicles #11. The story features a version of Batman that lived in the German Weimar Republic on the eve of World War II. Editor Lynda Barry wished to include an excerpt from Batman: Year 100 in The Best American Comics 2008 but was denied permission by DC Comics for unstated reasons.

Awards
In 2007, the series won two Eisner Awards for "Best Limited Series" and "Best Writer/Artist".

See also
 List of Elseworlds publications

References

External links
 The Dark Knight Returns: The dark prince of comix takes Batman 30 years into the future, Wired, February 2006

2006 comics debuts
2006 comics endings
Eisner Award winners for Best Limited Series
Fiction set in 2039